Dečja Vas is a village in the hills southeast of Trebnje in eastern Slovenia. The area is part of the historical Lower Carniola region. The Municipality of Trebnje is now included in the Southeast Slovenia Statistical Region.

The local church is dedicated to Saint Michael and belongs to the Parish of Trebnje. It was first mentioned in written documents dating to 1526, but was extensively rebuilt in the mid-19th century.

References

External links
Dečja Vas at Geopedia

Populated places in the Municipality of Trebnje